K. M. Doddi is a small town in Mandya district of the southern state of Karnataka, India.

Location
K. M. Doddi is located between Maddur and Malavalli, about 18 km away from the district centre of Mandya, and about 100 km away from the state capital, Bangalore.

Education
Bharathi Education trust in Bharathinagara is an institution of higher learning located in a rural and socially backward sector (as notified by the UGC) situated in Mandya District in Karnataka. It is an integrated First Grade College permanently affiliated to the University of Mysore, Established in 1970. It is the dream child of G. Made Gowda a veteran legislator parliamentarian, Gandhian statesman and an educational administrator gifted with foresight and vision. G. Made Gowda founded the Bharathi Education Trust in 1961 with the lofty object of providing higher education to empower rural students in a backward hinterland of Mandya.

Economy
This small town is agrarian in nature.  There are several nationalized bank branches such as State Bank of India,Bank of Baroda,Karnataka Bank, Canara Bank,Karnataka ಗ್ರಾಮೀಣ ಬ್ಯಾಂಕ್ ,ಡಿಸಿಸಿ ಬ್ಯಾಂಕ್, Chamundeswari Sugar's sugar factory ,Several mini and micro finance services such as IIFL,Muthoot,Manapuram.

References

Villages in Mandya district